The following list includes notable people who were born or have lived in Galena, Illinois. For a similar list organized alphabetically by last name, see the category page People from Galena, Illinois.

The Grant family and other notable Civil War era citizens

 Edward Dickinson Baker, U.S. Senator and Representative, served the Galena area; the only congressman to die in the Civil War
 Frederick Dent Grant (1850–1912), son of Ulysses S. Grant; went to public schools in Galena; New York City police commissioner
 Jesse Root Grant (1858–1932), son of Ulysses S. Grant; politician and author
 Julia Grant (1826–1902), wife of Ulysses S. Grant, First Lady of the United States (1869–77); first First Lady to write a memoir, though it wasn't published until 1875
 Nellie Grant (1855–1922), only daughter of Ulysses S. Grant
 Ulysses S. Grant (1823–1885), lived in Galena in 1860–1861, in a rented house while he worked at his father and brother's leather shop.  After the Civil War, Grant returned to Galena to a hero's welcome on 18 August 1865, and was presented with a furnished home, in which he lived until becoming president in 1869, and which he visited regularly until 1880.
 Ulysses S. Grant, Jr. (1852–1929), son of Ulysses S. Grant; owned U.S. Grant Hotel in San Diego, CA
 Elihu B. Washburne, Grant's Secretary of State; notable abolitionist; resident of Galena; the Elihu Benjamin Washburne House is a registered historic site

Galena's other notable generals

Galena had more citizen generals per capita than any other city in the nation (9 in a city of approximately 12,000).
 Augustus Louis Chetlain, considered the first man from Illinois to volunteer for the Union army; U.S. Consul to Belgium
 Jasper Adalmorn Maltby (1826–1867), general in the Union army during the American Civil War; military mayor of Vicksburg; head of registration bureau, enrolling black voters
 Ely Samuel Parker (1828–1895), Civil War-era general; transcribed Appomattox surrender terms; Grant's aide-de-camp until 1869; U.S. Commissioner of Indian Affairs (1869–71); superintendent during the building of Galena's post office and Marine Hospital; restarted Galena's Masonic Lodge and chartered it as Miner's Lodge #273, still in operation
 John Aaron Rawlins (1831–1869), Civil War general; Galena's City Attorney (1857); Grant's Secretary of War and adjutant assistant general
 John Corson Smith, general in the Union army during the Civil War; member of Miner's Lodge #273; later served in high-ranking positions in Illinois's Grand Lodge of Ancient and Accepted Freemasons, including Most Worshipful Grand Master
 John Eugene Smith, general in the Union army during the American Civil War

19th-century residents

John F. Beard (1822–1891), lived in Galena for one year in 1845; plasterer and Wisconsin State Assemblyman
James Beckwourth (1798–1866), explorer; came to Galena as a miner in the 1820s; some reports say that he was an indentured servant
Henry M. Billings (1806–1862), came to Galena as a miner in 1828; served in the Wisconsin Territorial House. In 1848, he served in the Wisconsin State Senate and then the Wisconsin State Assembly in 1858
John Wilford Blackstone, Sr. (1796–1868), miner and lawyer in Galena; served in the Wisconsin Territorial Legislature
 Ebenezer Brigham (1789–1861), one of the first settlers of Galena, in 1822; later one of the first permanent settlers of Dane County, Wisconsin; served on Territorial Council
 Richard H. Cain (1825–1887), Congressman, bishop, vice president of the "Colored Convention" (1853), first president of Paul Quinn College
 Donald A. Callahan (1876–1951), politician, born and raised in Galena; Republican Party nominee for the United States Senate seat in Idaho in 1938; was defeated; served in both chambers of the Idaho state legislature
 Thompson Campbell (1811–1868), politician, miner in Galena; Illinois Secretary of State (1843–1846); United States Representative for Illinois' 6th Congressional District (1851–1853)
 M. H. Cleary (1853–1933), Illinois state legislator, lawyer, and physician
 Samuel Crawford (1820–1860), Wisconsin Supreme Court
 Henry D. Dement (1840–1927), son of John Dement and grandson of Henry Dodge; served in the 13th Illinois Volunteer Infantry Regiment; elected to two terms in the Illinois House of Representatives starting in 1870, then two terms in the Illinois Senate, then two terms as Illinois Secretary of State (1880–1888)
 John Dement (1804–1883), Receiver of Public Moneys (two tenures); U.S. representative; delegate to every Illinois Constitutional Convention during his lifetime; president pro tempore of the 1862 and 1870 conventions
 Nelson Dewey (1813–1889), clerk for Daniels, Dennison, and Co. in Galena for a month in 1836; first governor of Wisconsin (1848–52)
 Moses Dickson (1824–1901), lived for a brief time and was married in Galena; abolitionist; helped organize the International Order of Twelve Knights and Daughters of Tabor, the Order of Twelve, which was created in Galena and used St. Louis as its headquarters to aid slaves in the Underground Railroad.
 Augustus C. Dodge (1812–1883), politician; worked in his father's lead mines (1827–1837); part of the first set of senators from Iowa (1848–1855); Minister to Spain (1855–1859).
 Henry Dodge (1782-1867), politician; operated mines in Galena. Served as Wisconsin’s first senator (1848-1857); Wisconsin’s first and fourth territorial governor (1836–41, 1845-1848); US Representative for Wisconsin territory (1841–45).
 Thomas Drummond (1809–1890), lawyer, had a practice in Galena (1835–50); member of the Illinois General Assembly as a Whig (1840–1841); during this time he became acquainted with fellow Whig Assemblyman Abraham Lincoln; judge for the Circuit Court of Illinois (c. 1841–1850), judge for the District of Illinois
 Jacob Fawcett (1847–1928), Nebraska Supreme Court Chief Justice
 Thomas Ford (1800-1850), politician; served as Illinois Governor (1842-1846).
 John Froelich (1849–1933), lived most of his early life and attended school in Galena; in 1892, developed the first stable gasoline/petrol-powered tractor with forward and reverse gears
 John H. Gear (1825–1900), 11th Governor of Iowa (1878–1882), Congressman; senator; Assistant Secretary of the Treasury 1892–1893
 Joseph Gillespie (1809–1885), mined in Galena; member of the Illinois State Senate 
 Henry Gratiot (1789–1836), trader and businessman who moved to Galena to raise his family in a free state; helped conduct a treaty that ended the Black Hawk War for the Galena area; his daughter married Elihu Washburne
 Moses Hallett (1834–1913), born in Galena; lawyer; moved to Colorado as a gold miner in 1860; judge on United States District Court for the District of Colorado 1877–1906
 William S. Hamilton (1797–1850), son of Alexander Hamilton; captain during the Winnebago War in the volunteer Illinois Militia; commanded a company raised in Galena, the Galena Mounted Volunteers
 Granville Hedrick (1814–1881), leader in the Latter Day Saints movement after the 1844 succession crisis; worked in Galena lead mines, 1843–44
 Stephen P. Hempstead (1812–1883), 2nd Governor of Iowa
 Joseph P. Hoge (1810–1891), Illinois congressman, president of the California state constitutional convention (1878), superior court judge
 William Henry Hooper (1813–1882), engaged in trade on the Mississippi River in the mid-1830s in Galena; later became a member of the LDS Church; Utah delegate to the United States Congress (1859–1861, 1865–1873)
 Thomas Hoyne (1817–1883), US District Attorney for Illinois
 Henry Jackson (1811–1857), operated a store in Galena; served in the Wisconsin Territorial Legislature, and in 1849 was elected to the first Minnesota Territorial Legislature; helped founded Mankato, Minnesota in 1852
Joseph Jefferson (1829–1905), at age 13 with his family performed for a year in Galena at the current site of Fried Green Tomatoes
George Wallace Jones (1804–1892), one of the first two senators from Iowa; mined in Galena and owned a store in Galena during the 1830s
 Joseph Russell Jones (1823–1909), politician, lawyer, merchant; became so successful that he built the Belvedere Mansion, the largest house in Galena, in 1857; U.S. Marshall for the Northern District; Minister Resident to Belgium; Collector of the Port of Chicago
 Lora Josephine Knight (1864-1945), philanthropist; born in Galena
 H. H. Kohlsaat (1853–1924), Chicago newspaper publisher; friend and adviser to five U.S. presidents
 Heinrich Lienhard (1822–1903), lived in Galena for a few months before emigrating to California; his writings are an important historical source for the history of the California Trail and Sutter's Fort in California 1846–1850
 James D. Lynch (1839–1872), minister, first black Mississippi Secretary of State
 George Frederick Magoun (1821–1896), educator, taught school in Galena 1844–46; first president of Iowa College (1865–1885) and a founding trustee; a liberal president, permitting the teaching of evolution despite his personal disagreement with Darwin's work; after his retirement as college president, took a professorship in Mental and Moral Science at Iowa College (1884–1890)
 Father Samuel Mazzuchelli (1806–1864), Italian Catholic missionary and architect; designed, built, founded, and was pastor (1835–1843) of St. Michael's Church; designed and built St. Mary's Church in Galena (1860), among many others built in the tri-state area; architect of the first Jo Daviess County Courthouse (1839) and Old Market Town Hall (1845); declared venerable by Pope John Paul II in 1993, the first step to becoming a saint
 Robert H. McClellan (1823–1902), practiced law in Galena for most of his adult life; elected as a Republican to a term in the Illinois House of Representatives (1860–1862) and two terms in the Illinois Senate (1876–1880); edited the Galena Gazette; president of the Bank of Galena
 William Douglas McHugh (1859–1923), born in Galena and practiced law there, 1883–1888; general counsel to International Harvester Corporation in Chicago 1920–1923
 Thomas McKnight (1787–1865), arrived in Galena as a miner and was appointed land receiver for the United States Land Office in Galena; served in the first Wisconsin Territorial Council in the Wisconsin Territorial Legislature; opened the first smelt furnace business in Dubuque, Iowa; unsuccessfully ran for Governor of Iowa in 1846
 Herman Melville (1819–1891), lived in Galena during the summer of 1840; his uncle was a prominent citizen in Galena in the 1840s
 Richard L. Murphy (1875–1936), senator from Iowa (1933–1936); began his journalism career at age 15 as a reporter for the Galena Gazette newspaper, 1890–1892
 Charles Sreeve Peterson (1818–1889), lived in Galena; an early leader in the Latter Day Saint movement
 Curtis H. Pettit (1833–1914), lived in Galena for one year in 1855; pioneer Minneapolis banker; served in Minnesota Senate and House of Representatives
 Thomas R. Potts (1810–1874), lived in Galena 1841–1849; local physician; Saint Paul, Minnesota's first mayor 1850–1851
 Orville C. Pratt (1819–1891), lawyer, judge, lived in Galena, had a law practice in Galena (1843–1849); 2nd Associate Justice of the Oregon Supreme Court (1848–52)
 William A. Richards (1849–1912), fourth Governor of Wyoming; educated in Galena
 Frederick Schwatka (1849–1892), army lieutenant; explorer of northern Canada and Alaska
 Benjamin R. Sheldon (1811–1897), lived in Galena until 1871; Illinois circuit court judge 1848–1870; served on the Illinois Supreme Court 1870–1885
 James W. Stephenson (1806–1838), lived in Galena; raised a company and served in the Black Hawk War; served in Illinois Senate (1834–1838); nominated as the Democrat's candidate for governor in the first Illinois Democratic State Convention in 1837, but had to withdraw six months later; died and was buried in Galena
 Levi Sterling (1804–1868), lived in Galena; served in the Wisconsin Territorial Council of the Wisconsin Territorial Legislature
 James M. Strode (1800?–1848), lived in Galena most of his life; during the Black Hawk War he was given command of the 27th Regiment of the Illinois militia and oversaw the construction of a fort in that city
 George Bell Swift (1845–1912), mayor of Chicago (1893; 1895–97), grew up in Galena
 Henry H. Taylor (1841–1909), born and lived most of his life in Galena; served in the 45th Illinois Infantry; received the Medal of Honor for his actions during the Battle of Vicksburg; the first to plant the Union's colors on the "enemy's works"
 Horace A. Tenney (1820–1906), moved to Galena in 1845 and started the Galena Jeffersonian newspaper with his brother; Wisconsin assistant state Geologist; served in the Wisconsin Assembly in 1857
 Jesse B. Thomas, Jr. (1806–1850), lawyer, judge, moved to Galena after he retired from the Illinois Supreme Court (1843–1848); Illinois Attorney General (1835–1836) 
 Hiram M. Van Arman, (1839–1904), educated in Galena; served as lieutenant in the 58th Illinois Volunteer Infantry Regiment; Secretary of the Arizona Territory (1882–1885)
 William B. Waddell (1807–1872), a founder of the Pony Express; mined in Galena 1824–1829
 Henry O. Wagoner  (1816–1901), civil rights activist and abolitionist in Chicago and Denver; lived in Galena 1839–1843;typesetter for a local newspaper
 Hempstead Washburne (1851–1918), mayor of Chicago (1891–1893); son of Elihu B. Washburne; born and raised in Galena; relocated to Chicago where he practiced law and served one term as mayor
 John Henry Weber (1779–1859), assistant superintendent of U.S. government lead mines in Galena in 1833; served briefly as superintendent until his retirement in 1840, previously an explorer and fur trader; explored territory in the Rocky Mountains and in Utah; namesake of Weber State University

20th-century residents

 Leo E. Allen (1898–1973), U.S. Congressman (1933–1961) representing the 13th and 16th districts; Jo Daviess County Clerk; taught at Galena; practiced law
 John W. Cox, Jr., Congressman from Illinois' 16th (1991–1993), the first Democrat to serve the area since 1850
 Edgar Cunningham (1910–1980), first African American Eagle Scout; married in Galena and briefly lived there
 G. Walter Dittmar (1872–1949), lived and practiced dentistry in Galena; faculty member at University of Illinois-Chicago College of Dentistry; president of the American Dental Association
 Katharine Gibbs (1863–1934), born in Galena; founder of Gibbs College
 John Hope (1911–2002), meteorologist who specialized in hurricane forecasting; on-air personality on The Weather Channel; lived his final years in Galena
 Thomas B. Howard (1854–1920), born and raised in Galena; commander in chief of the U.S. Pacific Fleet prior to entry into World War I; sailed around the world with the Great White Fleet 
 Donald William Kerst (1911–1993), physicist, born in Galena, earned a Ph.D. from University of Wisconsin in 1937; professor at University of Illinois, 1938–1957; during World War II, worked at Los Alamos, New Mexico; was employed at the General Atomic Laboratory, La Jolla, working on the Manhattan Project (1957–1962); developed the betatron in 1940 and became the first person to accelerate electrons using magnetic fields
 Francis Marshall, brigadier general during World War I; awarded the Army Distinguished Service Medal for his achievements in his command during the Meuse-Argonne Offensive
 Don McNeill (1907–1996), radio personality, creator and host of Don McNeill's Breakfast Club, which aired for more than 30 years
 Christian Narkiewicz-Laine, architect, artist, poet, writer, architecture critic, former architecture critic of the Chicago Sun-Times, former editor of Inland Architect, former director of the American Institute of Architects, former executive of Joseph P. Kennedy Enterprises, Inc., president of the Chicago Athenaeum: Museum of Architecture and Design
 Jim Post, folk singer-songwriter, playwright and actor; former member of band Friend and Lover; wrote the top 10 Billboard hit "Reach Out of the Darkness" in 1968
 Adlai Stevenson II (1900–1965), politician; owned a farm outside of Galena in the 1940s; Governor of Illinois (1949–1953); United States Ambassador to the United Nations; Democratic Party presidential candidate in 1952 and 1956
 James Wright, president of Dartmouth College (1998–2009), and history department faculty member 1969–2009; graduated from Galena High School in 1957; wrote a book on Galena's lead district in 1966
 LaMetta Wynn, first black woman to head an Iowa municipality: mayor of Clinton, Iowa (1995–2007); graduated from Galena High School

References

Galena
Galena